The 1964 European Cup final was a football match played at the Praterstadion in Vienna, Austria on 27 May 1964 to determine the winner of the 1963–64 European Cup. It was contested by Italian side Inter Milan and five-time European Cup winners Real Madrid. Inter won the match 3–1, with two goals Sandro Mazzola and one from Aurelio Milani giving them their first European Cup title; Felo scored Real Madrid's only goal of the game.

Route to the final

Match

Details

See also
 List of European Cup and UEFA Champions League finals
 1963–64 European Cup
 Inter Milan in European football
 Real Madrid CF in international football competitions

Notes

References

External links
1963–64 season at UEFA website
European Cup History 1964

European Cup Final
European Cup Final
Euro
European
UEFA Champions League finals
European Cup Final 1964
European Cup Final 1964
International club association football competitions hosted by Austria
Sports competitions in Vienna
1960s in Vienna
 27